Lisandro Meza (El Piñal, Los Palmitos, Sucre, 26 September 1939) is a Colombian singer and accordionist. Since he started playing the accordion in 1959, Lisandro has been described as the “King of Cumbia,” “El Macho de America” (ENG: The man of the Americas) and the “Master of Vallenato Sabanero.” Meza was once part of the group, Los Corraleros de Majagual in 1962, which was a successful band in both Colombia and Venezuela.

Known as "Lisandro Meza y Su Conjunto" between 1967 to 1994, his music is known for its eclectic styled with Dominican Merengue, Louisiana Zydeco, & Tex-Mex Norteño music His music is inspired by many famous artists and musicians such as Los Del Río, Aterciopelados, Alberto Barros, Aniceto Molina, and many more artists. Most of his music is prominent outside of Colombia, mainly in Peru, Mexico, the Southern Cone, North America, Europe, & China.

Early life
Lisandro Meza Márquez was born on September 26, 1939 at Los Palmitos in Sucre, Colombia. He starting to sing & learned to play the Accordion with his father, known as "La Armenia" in 1954. His first record was ”Aroma de las Flores,” recorded on the same year.

Career
In 1961, Meza joined Los Corraleros de Majagual, a very well-known group which was popular in both Colombia & Venezuela. During the time being a member of the Group, he recorded 41 LPs. He also declared the name of the band to change as "Combo Gigante."
In 1967, he renamed his group as "Lisandro Meza y Su Conjunto" with its Album Release, "Fiesta Sabanera." In 1979, he established his band, ”Los Hijos De La Niña Luz," where it included himself & his seven sons. 
Most of his recordings are taken in Barranquilla, Colombia.

On Media
Both of his songs 'Lejanía' (1982) & 'Te Llevare' (1980) were soundtracks for Ya No Estoy Aquí (2019).

Select discography

Albums
Cocacolo Cabello (1957?)
Mosaico Doble Cero (1960)
El Tigre del Acordeón (1960)
El Brujo Del Acordéon (1960)
Alegría Sabenera (1964)
El Ritmo del Acordéon (1964)
Fiesta Sabanera (1967)
Upa Je (1969)
Rey Sin Corona (1969)
Siguen las Fiestas (1970)
Salsita Mami (1970)
En Nueva York (1970)
Fiesta en Mi Pueblo (1970)
El Grande (1971)
El Chacho Del Acordeón (1971)
La Hija de Amaranto (1972)
El Accordion Pitador De Lisandro Meza (1973)
El Negrito (1973)
El Dios Cantor (1974)
El Campeón Mundial del Acordeón (1975)
El Burro Leñero (1976)
La Botella Picomocho (1977)
Lisandro 78 (1978)
El Innocente (1978)
El Sabanero (1978)
Lisandro Meza (Colmusica, 1978)
Sigo Pa' Lante (1979)
El León Del Acordeón (1980)
El Muchacho Alegre (1980)
Canción para una Muerte Anunciada (1981)
De Tal Palo Tal Astilla (1982)
Lejanía (1982)
¡Riiico...! (1982)
Solo Cumbias (1983)
Estás Pillao (1983)
¿Y de la Plata Que? (1984)
Mi Carrito (1985)
El Sabroso (1986) 
Alejo Y Yo (1986)
La Lay Del Ta (1986)
Lisandro Mezacladito (1986)
Grandes Exitos con... Lisandro Meza y Su Conjunto (1986)
Mezacladito Vol. 2 (1987)
El Sabanero Mayor (1987)
¡Aquí! (1988)
Mamando Gallo (1988)
Mezacladito Vol. 3 (1989)
El Mandamás (1989)
Soy Colombiano (1990)
Alas De Olvido (1990)
Internacionales (1990)
De Fiesta por el Mundo (1991)
Mucho Lisandro Para Colombia Vol. 1 (1991) 
Amor Lindo (1991)
Lisandro's Cumbia (1991)
Lisandro Meza y su Conjunto (Discos Fuentes, 1992)
Infinito (1992)
El Goool (1992)
Mucho Para Colombia, Vol. 1 (1993)
Lisandro's Cumbia (Kinex, 1993) 
20 Grandes Éxitos (1993)
El Macho (1993)
Cumbias Colombianas (1994)
El Sabanero Mayor (1994)
Mi Razon de Ser (1995)
El Mago del Accordion (1995)
A Punta de Maíz (1995)
La Suegra (1995) 
Por Que Usted Lo Ha Pedido (1996)
Pa'l Mundo (1996)
De Parranda en Mi Casa Vol. 2 (1997)
Solo Por Ti (1997)
Benditas Mujeres (1998)
En Vivo (1998)
Grandes Exitos (1999)
El Sabanero (El Sananero Mayor) (1999)
Lisandro Meza: Éxitos Originales (1999)
De Parranda en Mi casa. Vol. 1 (2000)
Los Super Éxitos De Lisandro Meza (2000)
El Embajador (2001)
El Sabanero Mayor (Hay Amores que Matan) (2001)
Con Mucho Sabor...! (2002)
Pa’ Todo el Mundo (2003)
Un Mundial De Éxitos (2003)
El Rey Sabanero (2004)
Su Majestad (2005)
Navidades con Lisandro Meza (2006)
Para Politico No (2007)
¿Por Que No Te Callas? (2008)
Colección de Oro (2009)
La Univerisidad de la Cumbia (2010)
Los Triple (2014)
Sueño Americano (2016)
Exitos Colombianos (2017)
De Parranda en Mi Casa Vol. 3 (2018)
63 Años de Vida Artística (2020)

Albums where Meza appears
¡Grito Parrandero! (1966, Los Corraleros de Majagua)
Rtimo de Colombia (1967, Los Corraleros de Majagual)
Nuevos Éxitos!! (1667, Los Corraleros de Majagual)
Nuevo Ritmo..! (1968, Los Corraleros de Majagual)
En Nueva York (1968, Los Corraleros de Majagual)
Los Corraleros (1968, Los Corraleros de Majagual)
Nuevo Tumbao (1969, Los Corraleros de Majagual)
¡Ésta si es Salsa! (1970, Los Corraleros de Majagual)
Mi Clemencia (1976, Los Corraleros de Majagual)
Todo El Año Es Carnaval (1979, Aníbal Velásquez)
Fiesta Costeña (1980, Los Hijos de La Niña Luz)
Vol. 2 (1980, Los Hijos de La Niña Luz)
Arrincónala (1981, Los Hijos de La Niña Luz)
Banda Los Hijos de La NIña Luz (1982)
Pura Pendejá (1983, Los Hijos De La Niña Luz)
Carnaval de La Niña Luz (1984, Los Hijos de La Niña Luz)
Con La Muela Pela' (1990, Los Hijos de la Niña Luz)
La Escapada (1990, Los Hijos de la NIña Luz)
Barranquilla de Caché (1992, Los Hijos de La Niña Luz)
Llegaron los Meza (2016, Duey Meza)
Con el Mismo Tumbao (2017, Joche Meza)
Llegaron Los Meza (Version 2) (2020, Duey Meza)
Evolucionar o Morir (2022, Duey Meza)

References

1939 births
Living people
21st-century accordionists